North Carolina State University's College of Engineering (CoE) is the flagship college of engineering in the state of North Carolina and the largest college at North Carolina State University in terms of enrollment, followed by CHASS, with 9 core departments and 3 affiliated departments offering 18 bachelor's, 17 master's and 13 doctoral degrees. The College is the fourth largest college of engineering in the nation. The college's Engineering Online has one of the largest enrollments of any online engineering program in the U.S. and is consistently listed as a "Best Value" in online engineering education by GetEducated.com.

Departments
The college has the following departments:

Biological and Agricultural Engineering
Biomedical Engineering
Chemical and Biomolecular Engineering
Civil, Construction, and Environmental Engineering
Computer Science
Electrical and Computer Engineering
Industrial and Systems Engineering
Integrated Manufacturing Systems Engineering
Materials Science and Engineering
Mechanical and Aerospace Engineering
Nuclear Engineering
Operations Research
Forest Biomaterials (Formerly: Wood and Paper Science)
Textile Engineering

Majors
The majors that the College offers include:

Aerospace Engineering (AE)
Biological Engineering (BAE)
Biomedical Engineering (BME)
Chemical Engineering (CHE)
Civil Engineering (CE)
Computer Engineering (CPE)
Computer Science (CSC)
Construction Engineering (CON)
Electrical Engineering (EE)
Environmental Engineering (ENE)
Industrial Engineering (IE)
Materials Science & Engineering (MSE)
Mechanical Engineering (ME)
Nuclear Engineering (NE)
Paper Science & Engineering (PSE)
Textile Engineering (TE)

References

External links

North Carolina State University